AMD Core Math Library (ACML) is an end-of-life software development library released by AMD, replaced by many open source libraries, including AMD libm 4.0. This library provides mathematical routines optimized for AMD processors. 

The successor to ACML is the AMD Optimizing CPU Libraries (AOCL), a set of mostly open source libraries compiled for AMD64 processors. It includes the open source BLIS, libFLAME, ScaLAPACK, FFTW, and AOCL-Sparse, plus the original closed-source AMD LibM, memcpy, and RNG.

Features
ACML consists of the following main components:
 A full implementation of Level 1, 2 and 3 Basic Linear Algebra Subprograms (BLAS), with optimizations for AMD Opteron processors.
 A full suite of Linear Algebra (LAPACK) routines.
 A comprehensive suite of Fast Fourier transform (FFTs) in single-, double-, single-complex and double-complex data types.
 Fast scalar, vector, and array math transcendental library routines
 Random Number Generators in both single- and double-precision

Supported platforms
AMD offers pre-compiled binaries for Linux, Solaris, and Windows available for download. Supported compilers include GNU Fortran, Intel Fortran Compiler, Microsoft Visual Studio, NAG, PathScale, PGI compiler, and Sun Studio.

License
ACML has a proprietary freeware license. The library is distributed in binary form free of charge, but cannot be freely redistributed.

See also
 GPUOpen - Open-source software suite for visual effects, HPC, and GPGPU
 Framewave - formerly the AMD Performance Library
 Open64 - AMD has an Open64 compiler distribution that can be used with ACML
 Math Kernel Library (MKL)

References

External links
Streaming Computing (User Guide)
Replacement: AMD Math Library (LibM), github

AMD software
Numerical libraries